The 2003 Individual Long Track/Grasstrack World Championship was the 33rd edition of the FIM speedway Individual Long Track World Championship.

The world title was won by Robert Barth of Germany for the second time.

Venues

Final Classification

References 

2003
Motorsport in England
Speedway competitions in France
Speedway competitions in Germany
2003 in German motorsport
Sports competitions in England
Motorsport competitions in New Zealand
Long
Speedway competitions in New Zealand
2003 in French motorsport
2003 in British motorsport
2003 in New Zealand motorsport